Raffray's sheath-tailed bat (Emballonura raffrayana) is a species of sac-winged bat in the family Emballonuridae. It is found in eastern Indonesia (including Western New Guinea), Papua New Guinea, and the Solomon Islands.

References

Emballonura
Bats of Oceania
Bats of Indonesia
Bats of New Guinea
Mammals of the Solomon Islands
Mammals of Papua New Guinea
Mammals of Western New Guinea
Mammals described in 1879
Taxa named by George Edward Dobson
Taxonomy articles created by Polbot